Éric René Boullier (born 9 November 1973) is a French motor racing engineer and manager. He was the racing director of the McLaren F1 Team from 2014 to 2018. During the 2010 to 2013 seasons, he was the team principal of Lotus F1, and was vice chairman of Formula One Teams Association (FOTA) until it was disbanded after six years.

Career
Boullier is a graduate of the French Institut Polytechnique des Sciences Appliquées engineering school where he studied aeronautical and spacecraft engineering. In 2002, he took the position of chief engineer with the Spanish Racing Engineering team, in charge of its World Series by Nissan programme.

In early 2003, he moved to the French DAMS team to become the managing and technical director, including the A1 Team France operation.

At the end of 2008, Boullier became the CEO of Gravity Sport Management, where he was in charge of many young drivers including Ho-Pin Tung, Adrien Tambay, Jérôme d'Ambrosio and Christian Vietoris.

After the  season, the Renault F1 team was bought-into by investment company Genii Capital. One of Genii's leading figures is Gerard Lopez, who is a major backer of Gravity Sport. On 5 January 2010, Boullier was announced as the new team principal, despite never having worked in Formula One before. For 2012, Boullier remained as team principal, which was renamed again to Lotus F1 Team. He continued in that role for the 2013 season.

On 24 January 2014, Boullier resigned as Team Principal for Lotus F1 Team Limited. Gérard Lopez assumed responsibilities as Lotus F1 Team Principal with immediate effect.

On 29 January 2014, Boullier was appointed racing director of the McLaren Formula One racing team under Ron Dennis, chairman and chief executive officer of McLaren Group. The announcement was made as part of a larger senior management overhaul at McLaren Group's racing unit.

On 4 July 2018 he announced his resignation from McLaren Racing.

In February 2019, Boullier joined the French Grand Prix organization as strategic sports and operational advisor and ambassador, and was named managing director in January 2020.

References

External links
 

1973 births
Living people
People from Laval, Mayenne
Institut Polytechnique des Sciences Avancées alumni
French motorsport people
French automotive engineers
A1 Grand Prix people
Formula One team principals
Motorsport agents
French sports agents
McLaren people
Renault people
Sportspeople from Mayenne